Nikolay Vladimirovich Shipil (born February 25, 1955 in Takhtabrod, Chistopolsky District, Kokchetav Oblast, Kazakh Soviet Socialist Republic, Soviet Union) is a senior manager in civil aviation, a distinguished employee of the Ministry of Transport of the Russian Federation, and president of International Investment Corporation, and was head of the Federal Air Transport Agency (FATA) of the Russian Federation from 2004 to 2005.

Education
 1975 – Leningrad Aviation Technical College of Civil Aviation;
 1980 – Leningrad Finance and Economics Institute
 1981-1983 – Academy of Civil Aviation, Department for advanced training
 1984 – Department for advanced professional training of senior management at the Academy of Civil Aviation (Saint Petersburg State University of Civil Aviation)
 1987 – Post-graduate studies at the Academy of Civil Aviation
 1991 – Academy of National Economy at the Council of Ministers, Agence pour la Cooperation Technique, Industrielle et Economique

Career
 1972-1975 – Cadet, Leningrad Aviation Technical College of Civil Aviation (LATUGA)
 1975-1978 – Member of staff, International Air Transport Division, Central Air Transport Agency (TSAVS) of the Leningrad civil aviation branch
 1978-1983 – Deputy Head, International Operations Department, Leningrad civil aviation branch
 1984-1985 – Deputy Head HR Department, Leningrad civil aviation branch
 1985-1989 – Deputy General Representative of Aeroflot, Zurich (Switzerland)
 1989-1997 – Deputy Director International Operations, Pulkovo Aviation Enterprise
 1997-1999 – Director for Commerce, Pulkovo Aviation Enterprise
 1999-2000 – Regional Representative Northern Europe and Baltic States, Pulkovo State Unitary Aviation Enterprise
 2000-2004 – Director General, ″Russia″ State Transport Company
 2004-2005 – Head, Federal Air Transport Agency
 2005-2006 – General Representative in Italy, OJSC ″Aeroflot″
 2004-2005 – Member of the Board of Directors, Sheremetyevo International Airport
 2004-2005 – Chairman of the Board of Directors, JSC ″Domodedovo airlines″
 2004-2005 – Member of the Board of Directors OJSC ″Aeroflot″
 2004-2005 – Member of the Board of Directors, Ilyushin Finance Co.

Awards

Government 

 Order of Friendship – 1997
 Honorary Title “Distinguished  Employee of the Transport of the Russian Federation” – 2003
 Certificate of Merit of the Government of the Russian Federation – 2003
 Acknowledgement of the Government of the Russian Federation – 2005

Departmental 

 ″Air Transport Expert″ Award Pin – 2002
 Honorary Medal of the Ministry of Foreign Affairs – 2002
 Badge of Honour of the Security Council of the Russian Federation – 2003
 Medal for Cooperation (Foreign Intelligence Service) – 2005

References
 http://www.aviaport.ru/digest/2004/03/19/74211.html
 http://russia-today.narod.ru/bio/x_ja/shipil_nv.htm
 http://www.itogi.ru/archive/2001/48/108827.html
 http://www.aviaport.ru/digest/2004/03/19/74211.html
 http://kp.ru/daily/22557/9635/
 http://www.kommersant.ru/doc/485775
 https://web.archive.org/web/20090501141642/http://www.avia.ru/inter/97
 http://www.aeroflot.ru/cms/new/2065
 http://www.allrus.info/main.php?ID=479796&arc_new=1
 http://www.aex.ru/fdocs/1/2001/12/10/1732/
 http://pravo.levonevsky.org/bazaru09/raspor/sbor32/text32771.htm
 http://www.lawmix.ru/pprf/121380/
 https://web.archive.org/web/20160303211033/http://poisk-zakona.ru/105534.html
 http://www.rg.ru/Anons/arc_2003/0222/3.shtm
 http://open.lexpro.ru/document/70014#53
 https://pipl.com/directory/name/Shipil/Nikolai/
 
 http://kommersant.ru/doc/146820/print
 http://www.kommersant.ru/doc/459449/print

Russian economists
Living people
1955 births
Russian Presidential Academy of National Economy and Public Administration alumni